Laricitrin is an O-methylated flavonol, a type of flavonoid. It is found in red grape (absent in white grape) and in Vaccinium uliginosum (bog billberries). It is one of the phenolic compounds present in wine.

Metabolism
Laricitrin is formed from myricetin by the action of the enzyme myricetin O-methyltransferase. It is further methylated by laricitrin 5'-O-methyltransferase into syringetin.

Glycosides 
 Laricitrin 3-O-galactoside, found in grape
 Laricitrin 3-glucoside found in Larix sibirica
 Laricitrin 3,5’-di-O-β-glucopyranoside, found in Medicago littoralis

References 

O-methylated flavonols
Resorcinols
Catechols